Edmond Biernat is a French former footballer born on 27 March 1939 at Monceau-le-Neuf (Aisne département). He was a forward.

Playing career 
 1957-1960 : Stade de Reims
 1960-1963 : FC Nancy
 1963-1966 : RC Strasbourg
 1966-1967 : Stade Français

Honours 
 Champion of France Division 1 in 1958 and 1960 with Stade de Reims

References

External links 
 

French footballers
Stade de Reims players
FC Nancy players
Stade Français (association football) players
RC Strasbourg Alsace players
1939 births
Living people
Association football forwards
Sportspeople from Aisne
Footballers from Hauts-de-France